Jorge Orta (born 1953) is a Paris-based, Italian-Argentinian contemporary visual artist.

Biography

Jorge Orta was born in 1953, in Rosario, Argentina. After graduating simultaneously from the Faculty of Fine Arts and the Faculty of Architecture at the Universidad Nacional de Rosario, Orta began his career as a painter, winning numerous awards for his work. In response to the increasing censorship of the Argentine military regime, his practice shifted to more avant-garde and alternative forms of visual communication, such as mail art and action-performance, working in underground artist collectives. He was the first Argentine artist to explore video and image projection technology, staging a series of controversial public installations in Rosario: Transcurso Vital (1981), Testigos Blancos (1982), Madera y Trapo (1983), and Fusion de sangre Latinoamericana (1984).

Orta was a lecturer in the Faculty of Fine Arts of the Universidad Nacional de Rosario and a member of CONICET, the Argentinean national council for scientific research, until 1984, when he received a scholarship from the Ministry of Foreign and European affairs to pursue a D.E.A. (Diplôme d'études approfondies) at the Sorbonne in Paris. In 1991 a fire in his Quai de la Seine studio tragically destroyed his entire archive of ephemeral works conducted in Argentina.

Parallel to a studio-based practice and the slow reconstruction of his archive, Orta began experimenting with the technology for large-scale image projection Light Works in the early 1980s and invented the Pyrex image plates for the PAE (Projector Art Effect) projectors. Exploring light as a new medium, he painted and illuminated mythical sites of architecture of cultural and historical significance across the world: Mount Aso (Japan), Cappadocia (Turkey), Zócalo (Mexico City), and Verdon Gorge (France). In 1995 he represented Argentina at the Biennale di Venezia with Light Works staged on Venetian Palaces along the Grand Canal (Venice)|Grand Canal. The most exceptional Light Work took place in 1992 during a three-week expedition along the Andes mountain range and culminated at the Inca vestiges of Machu Picchu and Sacsayhuamán to partake in the Inti Raymi in front of 200,000 Peruvian Indians.

In 1993 Orta founded Les Moulins together with his partner Lucy Orta with whom he now collaborates. Their major artworks include: Connector, OrtaWater, 70 x 7 The Meal, Antarctica, and Spirits. Lucy + Jorge Orta are currently restoring a complex of artist studios and residencies on former industrial buildings sites situated along the Grand Morin river in Marne La Vallée as a living extension of their practice: “The staging of a social bond ”(Pierre Restany, Process of Transformation. Ed. JM Place Paris 1996 ). Their collaborative work. which often deals with environmental sustainability and urgent humanitarian crises, has been the focus of major exhibitions at the Fondazione Bevilacqua La Masa Venice, Italy (2005); Museum Boijmans Van Beuningen, Rotterdam (2006); Galleria Continua, San Gimignano/ Beijing / Le Moulin (2007); Biennale del fin del Mundo, Antarctica (2007); Hangar Bicocca spazio d'arte, Milan (2008), Natural History Museum, London|Natural History Museum, London (2010); Shanghai Biennale (2012); MAXXI - National Museum of the 21st Century Arts, Rome (2012); Yorkshire Sculpture Park, Wakefield (2013); and Parc de la Villette, Paris (2014). In 2013 they were awarded the inaugural Terrace Wires commission in London.

In 2007 the artists received the Green Leaf Award for Sculpture, for artistic excellence with an environmental message, presented by the United Nations Environment Programme in partnership with the Natural World Museum, at the Nobel Peace Centre Oslo, Norway.

Bibliography
Potential Architecture (2013) 
Clouds | Nuages (2012) 
Lucy + Jorge Orta: Food Water Life (2011) 
Light Works: Lucy + Jorge Orta (2010) 
Mapping the Invisible: EU-Roma Gypsies (2010) 
Antarctica, Lucy + Jorge Orta (2008) 
Lucy + Jorge Orta Pattern Book, an introduction to collaborative practices (2007)  / 13-978-1-904772-75-0
Collective Space, Lucy + Jorge Orta (2006) 
Drink Water! Lucy and Jorge Orta (2005) 
'Jorge Orta: Transparence. La face cachée de la lumière (1997) 
'Light Messenger. Jorge Orta. Venice Biennale (1997)

References

External links
 Studio Orta, official website
 Motive Gallery
 Cape Farewell 
 Light Works
 Connector
 OrtaWater
 70 x 7 The Meal
 Antarctica
 Spirits

1953 births
Living people
Artists from Rosario, Santa Fe
Argentine people of Italian descent
National University of Rosario alumni
Argentine artists
Italian contemporary artists
French installation artists
Modern artists
Argentine expatriates in France
Art duos
Argentine contemporary artists